Eriocaulon sivarajanii is a critically endangered monocotyledonous plant endemic to Kozhikode in the state of Kerala, India.

References

sivarajanii
Flora of Kerala